The PAF XT-004 Layang was a basic trainer aircraft developed by the Philippine Air Force's Air Force Research and Development Center (AFRDC).

Design and development
After an intensified and revitalized self-reliance program in 1996, the XT-004 project, code-named "Layang", was developed by the PAFRDC in Villamor Air Base, Pasay. It is a single-engine aircraft powered by a 350 hp Allison Model 250-B17D turboshaft engine and is constructed from aluminum with a semi-monocoque structure. According to the PAFRDC, the aircraft jigs and fixtures have already been built since 1985, but lack of funds hindered the completion of the project.

Operators

 Philippine Air Force

See also

References

Aircraft manufactured in the Philippines